The 2012–13 Croatian Ice Hockey League season was the 22nd season of the Croatian Ice Hockey League, the top level of ice hockey in Croatia. KHL Medveščak Zagreb II won the championship by defeating KHL Mladost Zagreb in the final.

Format 
The league began the season with four teams, three from Croatia and HDK Maribor from Slovenia. Maribor pulled-out of the championship after the first round. KHL Sisak joined the championship for the second round, which consisted of six games played each. The three Croatian teams that participated in the first round received bonus points which carried over to the second round. KHL Mladost Zagreb received six points, KHL Medveščak Zagreb II received four points, and KHL Zagreb received two points. KHL Sisak started the second round with zero points. All four teams that participated in the second round qualified for the playoffs.

First round

Second round

Playoffs

Semifinals
 KHL Mladost Zagreb - KHL Zagreb 2:0 (7:3, 11:2)
 KHL Medveščak Zagreb II - KHL Sisak 2:0 (5:0 Forfeit, 5:0 Forfeit)

Final 
 KHL Medveščak Zagreb II - KHL Mladost Zagreb 3:2 (6:5, 3:8, 3:8, 5:3, 7:3)

External links
Season on hrhokej.net

Cro
Croatian Ice Hockey League seasons
1
2012–13 in Slovenian ice hockey